Magdaléna Rybáriková was the defending champion, but chose to compete in Birmingham instead.

Tereza Smitková won the title, defeating Dayana Yastremska in the final, 7–6(7–2), 3–6, 7–6(7–4).

Seeds

Draw

Finals

Top half

Bottom half

References
Main Draw

Fuzion 100 Ilkley Trophy - Singles